The 2007–08 Magnolia Beverage Masters season was the 33rd season of the franchise in the Philippine Basketball Association (PBA).

Key dates
August 19: The 2007 PBA Draft took place at Market! Market! in Bonifacio Global City, Taguig.

Draft picks

Roster

Depth chart

Philippine Cup

Game log

|- bgcolor="#bbffbb"
| 1
| October 14
| Air21
| 121–112
| Seigle (28)
| 
| 
| Araneta Coliseum
| 1–0
|- bgcolor="#bbffbb"
| 2
| October 21
| Sta.Lucia
| 101–96
| Seigle, Hontiveros (18)
| 
| 
| Araneta Coliseum
| 2–0
|- bgcolor="#edbebf" 
| 3
| October 26
| Purefoods
| 90–93
| Tugade (23)
| 
| 
| Araneta Coliseum
| 2–1
|- bgcolor="#bbffbb" 
| 4
| October 28
| Coca Cola
| 89–78
| Tugade (21)
| 
| 
| Araneta Coliseum
| 3–1

|- bgcolor="#edbebf" 
| 5
| November 3
| Talk 'N Text
| 94–100
| Seigle (26)
| 
| 
| Muntinlupa
| 3–2
|- bgcolor="#bbffbb" 
| 6
| November 9
| Alaska
| 112–108
| Seigle (20)
| 
| 
| Ynares Center
| 4–2
|- bgcolor="#edbebf" 
| 7
| November 16
| Welcoat
| 93–95
| Hontiveros (24)
| 
| 
| Cuneta Astrodome
| 4–3
|- bgcolor="#bbffbb" 
| 8
| November 18
| Brgy.Ginebra
| 101–90
| Tugade (34)
| 
| 
| Araneta Coliseum
| 5–3
|- bgcolor="#edbebf" 
| 9
| November 23
| Red Bull
| 95–107
| 
| 
| 
| Araneta Coliseum
| 5–4
|- bgcolor="#bbffbb" 
| 10
| November 30
| Purefoods
| 108–86
| Calaguio (22)
| 
| 
| Ynares Center
| 6–4

|- bgcolor="#bbffbb"
| 11
| December 2
| Talk 'N Text
| 96–93
| Hontiveros (26)
| 
| 
| Ynares Center
| 7–4
|- bgcolor="#edbebf" 
| 12
| December 8
| Red Bull
| 88–94
| Seigle (20)
| 
| 
| Cavite City
| 7–5
|- bgcolor="#edbebf" 
| 13
| December 12
| Coca Cola
| 108–114
| Tenorio (23)
| 
| 
| Araneta Coliseum
| 7–6
|- bgcolor="#edbebf" 
| 14
| December 16
| Brgy.Ginebra
| 100–115
| Seigle (19)
| 
| 
| Araneta Coliseum
| 7–7
|- bgcolor="#bbffbb"
| 15
| December 22
| Alaska
| 104–92
| Tugade (30)
| 
| 
| Cagayan de Oro
| 8–7
|- bgcolor="#bbffbb"
| 16
| December 28
| Air21
| 
| 
| 
| 
| Araneta Coliseum
| 9–7

|- bgcolor="#edbebf"
| 17
| January 6
| Sta.Lucia
| 77–99
| 
| 
| 
| Araneta Coliseum
| 9–8
|- bgcolor="#bbffbb"
| 18
| January 11
| Welcoat
| 96–84
| Seigle (32)
| 
| 
| Araneta Coliseum
| 10–8

Fiesta Conference

Game log

|- bgcolor="#edbebf"
| 1
| April 2
| Purefoods
| 126–127 (2OT)
| Hontiveros (29)
| 
| 
| Araneta Coliseum
| 0–1
|- bgcolor="#edbebf"
| 2
| April 6
| Sta.Lucia
| 86–88
| Watkins (20)
| 
| 
| Ynares Center
| 0–2
|- bgcolor="#bbffbb" 
| 3
| April 11
| Alaska
| 89–81
| Racela (18) Seigle (18)
| 
| 
| Araneta Coliseum
| 1–2
|- bgcolor="#bbffbb" 
| 4
| April 13
| Talk 'N Text
| 91–86
| 
| 
| 
| Araneta Coliseum
| 2–2
|- bgcolor="#bbffbb" 
| 5
| April 20
| Brgy.Ginebra
| 95–92
| Watkins (20)
| Watkins (19)
| 
| Araneta Coliseum
| 3–2
|- bgcolor="#edbebf" 
| 6
| April 30
| Welcoat
| 101–108
| Watkins (26)
| 
| 
| Araneta Coliseum
| 3–3

|- bgcolor="#bbffbb" 
| 7
| May 3
| Red Bull
| 102–95
| Tugade (22)
| 
| 
| Lipa City, Batangas
| 4–3
|- bgcolor="#edbebf" 
| 8
| May 9
| Coca Cola
| 92–106
| Tugade (23)
| 
| 
| Araneta Coliseum
| 4–4
|- bgcolor="#bbffbb" 
| 9
| May 16
| Purefoods
| 88–81
| Seigle (27)
| 
| 
| Araneta Coliseum
| 5–4
|- bgcolor="#edbebf" 
| 10
| May 21
| Air21
| 90–96
| Watkins (29)
| 
| 
| Ynares Center
| 5–5
|- bgcolor="#edbebf" 
| 11
| May 28
| Brgy.Ginebra
| 76–87
| Watkins (22)
| 
| 
| Araneta Coliseum
| 5–6
|- bgcolor="#bbffbb" 
| 12
| May 31
| Talk 'N Text
| 84–82
| Tugade (29)
| 
| 
| Puerto Princesa
| 6–6

|- bgcolor="#bbffbb" 
| 13
| June 4
| Welcoat
| 94–86
| Racela (20)
| 
| 
| Araneta Coliseum
| 7–6
|- bgcolor="#edbebf" 
| 14
| June 8
| Red Bull
| 75–84
| 
| 
| 
| Araneta Coliseum
| 7–7
|- bgcolor="#bbffbb" 
| 15
| June 13
| Sta.Lucia
| 80–74
| McCaskill (16)
| 
| 
| Cuneta Astrodome
| 8–7
|- bgcolor="#bbffbb" 
| 16
| June 20
| Coca Cola
| 81–77
| Tugade (14)
| 
| 
| Cuneta Astrodome
| 9–7
|- bgcolor="#edbebf" 
| 17
| June 25
| Air21
| 88–90
| 
| 
| 
| Araneta Coliseum
| 9–8
|- bgcolor="#bbffbb" 
| 18
| June 29
| Alaska
| 80–79
| Cortez (18)
| 
| 
| Araneta Coliseum
| 10–8

Transactions

Trades

Three-team trade

Additions

Subtractions

References

San Miguel Beermen seasons
Magnolia